Mercadier (died 10 April 1200) was a famous Occitan warrior of the 12th century, and the leader of a group of mercenaries in the service of Richard I, King of England.

In 1183 he appears as a leader of Brabançon mercenaries in Southern France. He entered King Richard's service in 1184, attacking and laying waste to lands of Aimar V of Limoges. In 1188 he managed seventeen castles captured from the Count of Toulouse. Suggestions that he accompanied Richard on the Third Crusade are based on a charter that has been established as a forgery. There is no evidence that Mercadier was with Philip Augustus when the king left the Holy Land for France. Instead, it appear that Mercadier remained in the Angevin realm with his troops to defend Richard's estates in the latter's absence.

After Richard's return from the Holy Land, Mercadier accompanied him everywhere as his right hand man, travelling and fighting by his side. Richard eulogized Mercadier's exploits in his letters, and gave him the estates left by Ademar de Bainac in Limousin, who died without heirs around 1190. During the various wars between Richard and Philip Augustus of France, Mercadier fought successively in Berry, Normandy, Flanders and Brittany. When Richard was mortally wounded at the siege of Châlus in March 1199, it was Mercadier's physician who cared for him. According to one account, Mercadier avenged his death by storming the castle, hanging the defenders and flaying a "Pierre Basile", the crossbowman who had shot the king, despite Richard's last act pardoning him.

Mercadier then entered the service of Eleanor of Aquitaine, and ravaged Gascony and the city of Angers. On Easter Monday, 10 April 1200, he was assassinated while on a visit to Bordeaux to pay his respects to Eleanor of Aquitaine. His murder was at the hands of six men-at-arms employed by Brandin, a rival mercenary captain in the service of Richard's successor King John Lackland.

One of the bridges of the Château Gaillard (built by his employer King Richard) is named for him.

In historical fiction

Books and dramas
Five novels "Les aventures de Guilhem d’Ussel" of Jean d'Aillon
During the reign of Philip August, Guilhem d’Ussel encounters several chiefs of mercenaries : Mercadier, Lambert Cadoc (Lord of Gaillon) and Brandin.
 De Taille et d'Estoc (The youth of Guilhem d'Ussel)
 Marseille, 1198
 Paris, 1199
 Londres, 1200
 Montségur, 1201

Mercadier also made an appearance in Robin and Marian, the 1976 film serving as right hand to Richard the Lionheart.  Played by Bill Maynard.

Mercardier features prominently in The Outlaw Chronicles series by Angus Donald, especially books 4 (Warlord) and 5 (Grail Knight), as a major antagonist. He is portrayed as a ruthless killer and mercenary leader with few or no redeeming qualities, and as the main perpetrator of English atrocities during the 3rd Crusade and King Richard's wars against the French.

References

Sources

"Mercadier", in Bibliothèque de l'École des Chartes, 1st series, t. iii., pp. 417–443.
The Art of Warfare in Western Europe during the Middle Ages from the Eighth Century (Warfare in History) by J. F. Verbruggen, pp. 116–117*

1200 deaths
Year of birth unknown
Medieval Occitan people
11th-century French people
Medieval French knights
Christians of the Third Crusade